Mycetocola lacteus is a species of Gram-positive, obligately aerobic and non-spore-forming bacterium in the genus Mycetocola which has been isolated from the cultivated mushroom Pleurotus ostreatus that is located in Japan.

References

Microbacteriaceae
Bacteria described in 2001